Hayworth is a surname, and may refer to:

 Donald Hayworth (1898–1982), U.S. Representative from Michigan
 J. D. Hayworth
 Nan Hayworth, U.S. Representative for New York
 Ray Hayworth
 Rita Hayworth (1918–1987), an iconic American film actress and dancer 
 Volga Hayworth
 Tyler Hayworth, College Football Player, 2012-2016 Wake Forest University Football

See also
 Haworth
 Heyworth

References